Clacton-on-Sea is a seaside town in the Tendring District in the county of Essex, England. It is located on the Tendring Peninsula and is the largest settlement in the Tendring District with a population of 56,874 (2016). The town is situated around 76.9 miles north-east of Central London, 40 miles from Chelmsford, 57.9 miles from Southend-on-Sea, 15.8 miles south-east of Colchester Town and 16.3 miles south of Harwich. The town is a seaside resort, located on the east coast of England.

The town's economy continues to rely significantly on entertainment and day-trip facilities; it is strong in the service sector, with a large retired population. The north-west part of the town has two business/industrial parks. In the wider district, agriculture and occupations connected to the Port of Harwich provide further employment. It lies within the United Kingdom Parliament constituency of Clacton.

Geography
Clacton is located between Jaywick and Holland-on-Sea along the coastline and Great Clacton to the north. The relevant local authority is Tendring District Council.

It is at the south-eastern end of the A133. The resort of Frinton-on-Sea is nearby to the north-east.

Amenities

Clacton has a pleasure pier, arcades, a golf course, caravan parks and an airfield. The town and its beaches are still popular with tourists in the summer and there is an annual entertainment programme including the Clacton Carnival, which starts on the second Saturday in August and lasts for a week. Clacton Airshow, an aerial display, takes place on the Thursday and Friday before the August Bank Holiday, with historic and modern aircraft such as the Lancaster, Spitfire, Hurricane, Harrier, Jaguar, Tornado, and helicopters. There are also wing-walkers and the Red Arrows.

Clacton has a shopping area with many of the usual national chains represented, and a Factory Shopping Village in the north of the town.

Clacton has two theatres, the West Cliff Theatre and the Princes Theatre. The West Cliff is one of the last theatres in the country to put on an old-style summer show.

History

Clacton was a site of the lower Palaeolithic Clactonian industry of flint tool manufacture. The "Clacton Spear", a wooden (yew) spear found at Clacton in 1911 and dated at 450,000 years ago, is the oldest such spear to have been found in Britain.

There is plentiful archaeological evidence of scattered settlement in the area, including Beaker Folk traces at Point Clear to the south and round houses (as cropmarks) near the A133 extension from Weeley to the north. There may have been a pre-Roman (i.e. Celtic) settlement at Gt. No traces of substantial Roman settlement have been found at Clacton though there are several Roman villa sites nearby (e.g. Alresford, Wivenhoe, Brightlingsea). After the Anglo-Saxon migration and the foundation of the kingdom of Essex, a village called Claccingtun ("the village of Clacc's or Clacca's people") was established. No pre-Norman buildings survive today. The Domesday Book of 1086 records the village as Clachintuna.

Clacton was repeatedly surveyed by the Army in the Napoleonic Wars as a possible invasion beach-head for Napoleon and his Dutch allies. There was a large army and militia camp where Holland-on-Sea now stands. In 1810 five Martello Towers were built to guard the beaches between Colne Point to the south and what is now Holland-on-Sea to the north of the town.

In 1871 the Essex railway engineer and land developer Peter Bruff, the steamboat owner William Jackson, and a group of businessmen built a pier and the Royal Hotel (now converted to flats) on a stretch of farmland adjoining low gravelly cliffs and a firm sand-and-shingle beach near the villages of Great and Little Clacton. The town of Clacton-on-Sea was officially incorporated in 1872 and laid out rather haphazardly over the next few years: though it has a central 'grand' avenue (originally Electric Parade, now Pier Avenue) the street plan incorporates many previously rural lanes and tracks, such as Wash Lane. Plots and streets were sold off piecemeal to developers and speculators. In 1882 the Great Eastern Railway already serving the well-established resort of Walton-on-the-Naze along the coast, built a spur to Clacton-on-Sea with a junction at Thorpe-le-Soken.

Clacton grew into the largest seaside resort between Southend-on-Sea and Great Yarmouth, with some 10,000 residents by 1914 and approx. 20,000 by 1939. Due to its accessibility from the East End of London and the Essex suburbs, Clacton, like Southend, remained preferentially geared to catering for working-class and lower-middle-class holidaymakers – though it had, and has, its more 'select' areas.

For well over a century Clacton Pier has been an RNLI lifeboat station.

Just before the Second World War the building of Butlin's Holiday Camp boosted its economy, though the Army took it over between then and 1945 for use as an internment, engineer, pioneer and light anti-aircraft artillery training camp.

Four notable incidents occurred in Clacton-on-Sea during World War II. First, very early in the war a German airman bailed out over the town. Procedures for dealing with enemy captives were not yet well-established and he was treated as a celebrity guest for some days, including by the town council, before eventually being handed over to the military . Second, a Luftwaffe Heinkel 111 bomber crashed into the town on 30 April 1940, demolishing several houses in the Vista Road area as one of the magnetic mines on board exploded on impact, killing the crew and two civilians; another mine was defused by experts from the Navy. Third, the Wagstaff Corner area was bombed in May 1941, demolishing some well-known buildings. Finally, a V2 rocket hit in front of the Tower Hotel, injuring dozens of troops inside though without bringing down the structure. Clacton lay beneath the route taken by many of the V1 and V2 bombs aimed at London.

A big role in the town during the pre- and post-war period was played by the Kingsman family, which bought and developed the pier and ran a pleasure-steamer service from London. A summer sea excursion to Calais also ran until the early 1960s. Butlin's reopened the holiday camp after the war. This, along with the expansion of the nearby chalet town of Jaywick, originally a speculative private development of inter-war years, and increasingly capacious caravan sites, all swelled by the movement of retired Londoners into the area, altered the character of the town.

In 1964 the town was in the national news when rival gangs of Mods and Rockers fought on the sea front and several arrests were made. (In mid-60s youth culture, 'Mods' favoured scooters and wore parkas, while 'rockers' rode motorcycles and wore leather and denim. The incident became known locally as 'The Battle of Pier Gap' following a headline in the local paper, the East Essex Gazette). Throughout the 1960s Clacton beach remained a popular summer excursion for residents of Essex and east London and in August was often crammed to capacity in the area around the Pier. The pirate radio ship MV Galaxy, which broadcast Wonderful Radio London, was anchored offshore from 1964 until its forced closure in 1967.

With the advent of cheap flights to Mediterranean resorts in the 1970s, the holiday industry began to decline. Increasingly, hotels' and guest-houses' spare capacity came to be used as 'temporary' accommodation by the local authority to house those on welfare, refugees, migrants and asylum seekers. Pier Ward, in the centre of the town, is one of the poorest in the UK; (nearby Jaywick is often cited as the poorest of all). Since around 1970 several well-known local buildings have been demolished, including the palatial art deco Odeon Cinema (a great loss to both the town and the county); the Warwick Castle Pub; the Waverley Hotel; Barker House, a large home for the learning disabled, and Groom's Crippleage, which housed orphaned handicapped girls from London. Cordy's, a well-known large seafront restaurant has recently been demolished. The site of Butlin's Holiday Camp was redeveloped as a housing estate. The once famously crowded bus station in Jackson Road has become a car park. The Ocean Revue Theatre, where Max Bygraves made one of his first appearances, has closed.

The town expanded substantially in the 1980s, 1990s and first decade of the 21st century, with new housing estates on the rural margins of town, and some brownfield developments. Many residents commute to work in Colchester, Witham, Chelmsford or London. Clacton was in the news when its town centre and seafront areas were struck by an F1/T2 tornado on 23 November 1981, as part of the record-breaking nationwide tornado outbreak on that day. A large wind-farm, built in the early 2000s some 3 miles offshore on Gunfleet Sands, is visible from many streets and from various places in the flat hinterland of the town. However, in common with many seaside towns, unemployment has remained stubbornly high in Clacton itself compared with much of southeast England.

Seaside resort

The modern day Clacton-on-Sea was founded by Peter Bruff in 1871 as a seaside resort. Originally the main means of access was by sea; Steamships operated by the Woolwich Steam Packet Company docked from 1871 at Clacton Pier which opened the same year. The pier now offers an amusement arcade and many other forms of entertainment.

People who wanted to come by road had to go through Great Clacton. In the 1920s, London Road was built to cope with the influx of holidaymakers. Later, in the 1970s, the eastern section of the A120 was opened obviating the need for Clacton visitors to go through Colchester. Today Paddle Steamer Waverley operates from Clacton Pier offering pleasure boat excursions.

Clacton has a Blue Flag beach at Martello Bay (two more are locally at Dovercourt Bay & Brightlingsea). Clacton Seafront Gardens which run along the top of the seafront west of Clacton Pier has also been awarded a Green Flag and includes various sections with formal gardens, memorials and places to sit.

Former Butlins

In 1936, Billy Butlin bought and refurbished the West Clacton Estate, an amusement park to the west of the town. He opened a new amusement park on the site in 1937 and then, a year later on 11 June 1938, opened the second of his holiday camps. This location remained open until 1983 when, due to changing holiday tastes, Butlins decided to close the facility. It was then purchased by former managers of the camp who reopened it as a short-lived theme park, called Atlas Park. The land was then sold and redeveloped with housing.

Sport
Clacton has a cricket club and a football team called F.C. Clacton, whose best F.A. Cup performance was the 1st round. The football team play at the Austin Arena with the bus shelter being the stand for the passionate supporters.  The name was derived after someone said it looked like a bus shelter. The club then took bus timetables and stuck them on it, to resemble a bus shelter.

The Cricket Club has many grounds around Clacton with one in Holland-on-sea and another where Essex County Cricket Club used to play. Clacton also have a rugby club with teams ranging from under 12s to a first and second team. The first and second teams play in Essex League 1 and train on a Tuesday night at 7 which is held at the rugby club in Valley Road.

Industry 
Prior to the foundation of Clacton-on-Sea the chief occupations in the area were farming and small-scale fishing. A steam-powered mill was built in 1867 to replace the local windmill, which was eventually demolished in 1918. Today the town's main industrial area is in the northeast of the town (Gorse Lane Industrial Estate and Oakwood Business Park) which contain a variety of businesses and light industrial units.

Clacton Urban District Council had provided the town with electricity since the early twentieth century from Clacton power station. Upon nationalisation of the electricity industry in 1948 ownership passed to the British Electricity Authority and later to the Central Electricity Generating Board. Electricity connections to the national grid rendered the small 2.15 megawatt (MW) internal combustion engine power station redundant. It closed in 1966; in its final year of operation it delivered 796 MWh of electricity to the town.

In 2013 Tendring District Council undertook significant work to develop a 10-year Economic Strategy for the district which includes Clacton on Sea.  Now, half-way through this 10-year strategy, the approach has been refreshed to add a greater focus on the populations of Clacton and Jaywick Sands between 2020 and 2024, noting a decline in economic performance of these locations. The strategy focuses specifically on local participation within communities and addressing long term prosperity and also proposes bold action in Clacton town centre, recognising that its future is unlikely to be led by retail.

Landmarks

Clacton has comparatively few buildings of architectural interest. In addition to the surviving large seafront hotels there are:

St John's Church, Gt Clacton
The parish church of St John, Gt. Clacton, is the oldest surviving building in the urban district, dating from the early decades of the 12th century, though considerably altered. A local legend that smugglers used a tunnel from the coast to the Ship Inn (16th century) opposite the church is discounted by historians. The pub is more than 1.5 km from the sea. The nearby Queens Head inn may be pre-1600.

St James's Church
A large (and actually unfinished) church of 1912-13 between Tower Road and Wash Lane, St James's is a rare southern building by Temple Moore, an architect chiefly associated with the North of England. Somewhat grim on the outside (as Pevsner noted in The Buildings of Essex), the interior is surprisingly light and spare, with different orders of arch on either side of the chancel giving an asymmetrical feel. The building is only a third of its intended size, and the original plans included a large tower at the West end. Ordered for Anglo-catholic worship, it is large, without pews and boasts an impressive reredos which finishes in a canopy at the East end.

Clacton Railway Station
The main station building dates from 1929. A typical neo-Georgian 'late Imperial'-style building, it is notable chiefly for the decorative use of moulded 'fasces' on either side of the main entrance - a rare instance of Fascist symbolism in British civic architecture.

Clacton Town Hall

Clacton Town Hall is a neo-Georgian building, with a tall portico of Composite columns flanked by two-story wings, in Station Road. It also houses the Princes Theatre. The architect was Sir Alfred Brumwell Thomas.

Martello Towers
There are three of these between the Pier and Jaywick Sands to the south. They date from 1809 to 1812. The immensely thick brick walls look circular, but are in fact rounded triangles, designed to deflect cannon-fire. The tower nearest the Pier was, unusually, built within a moat. The name comes from similar fortifications in Mortella, Corsica.

Moot Hall
A real oddity: in Albany Gardens West, near the seafront to the north of the Pier, this house of the 1400s was moved from the village of Hawstead, Suffolk and reconstructed here in 1911 – though considerably modernised and altered – for a London builder named J H Gill.

St Helena Hospice
In Jackson Road, in the town centre. A curved wood and brick corner design of 2001-2 by the Purcell Miller Tritton architectural partnership.

Jaywick Sands

Originally (1920s and '30s) a huddle of self-builds and kit-houses in a bleak field dangerously close to mean sea level, and in places still little more than a shanty town, Jaywick nevertheless has its admirers as 'folk-architecture'. It was badly damaged by the floods of 1953, when almost 50 residents died. The Martello Tower is used as an art space.

Clacton Pier

Clacton Pier was the first building of the new resort of Clacton-on-Sea. Bought by Ernest Kingsman in 1922, it remained in the ownership of the Kingsman family until 1971. In March 2009 the pier was purchased by the Clacton Pier Company, who installed a  helter-skelter as a new focal point.

Gunfleet Sands Offshore Wind Farm

Climate
Clacton has an oceanic climate (Köppen "Cfb") but with lower precipitation than most of the UK and Western Europe. This makes for pleasantly warm and relatively dry summers (which also enhances the towns popularity as a seaside town), but also fairly chilly winter days. For the 1961–1990 observation period, Clacton averaged 103.7 days with at least 1mm of rain, and just 24.3 air frosts a year- comparable to south west coastal locations.

Demography
Clacton's population increased substantially during the 20th century from 7,456 at the 1901 census to 25,000 in the 1960s, 45,065 in 1991 and reaching over 53,000 by 2001.
Population as 107,237 according to Dataloft Inform, Land Registry, 2011 Census

Education
St Osyth's Teacher Training College occupied several buildings in Clacton, mostly along Marine Parade East, until its amalgamation with the North East Essex Technical College in the late 1970s. The town is served by two secondary schools, Clacton Coastal Academy and Clacton County High School. Adult Community Learning, run by Essex County Council, is situated in St Osyth Road.

Transport

Clacton-on-Sea is located at the terminus of the A133 road, which runs between Clacton and Colchester.

The town is served by Clacton-on-Sea railway station, a terminus of the Sunshine Coast Line which links the town with Colchester; the other terminus is at Walton-on-the-Naze, on a branch from Thorpe-le-Soken. Trains are operated by Greater Anglia and generally run hourly to London Liverpool Street via Colchester and Chelmsford; the full journey takes about 90 minutes.

Local bus routes are operated by Hedingham & Chambers; termini include Colchester, Harwich, Manningtree and Walton-on-the-Naze. First Essex withdrew from serving Clacton in January 2020; Hedingham & Chambers are now the only operator serving the town from Colchester.

National Express operates long-distance coach services to/from London and Liverpool.

Clacton Airfield has been active since its use by the Royal Air Force during World War II. It does not operate scheduled passenger flights.  In the 1990s, the airfield was featured in the BBC Television series Airport.

Conservation
Clacton's environmental qualities draw on several things: proximity to the sea, its evolution as the resort, its attraction as a retirement area, and its business and trade. The conservation and enhancement of Clacton's various environmental qualities depends on assessment, evaluation and management.

Both Tendring District Council and Essex County Council can advise on heritage and historic buildings. The district also advises on wildlife conservation, and on obtaining grants for managing countryside for public enjoyment and appreciation. The county has an archaeological service.

Notable people

The following were all born or have lived in Clacton-on-Sea:
 George Wylie Hutchinson (1852–1942), Canadian painter and leading illustrator, lived in Clacton in retirement
 Arthur Townsend (1883-1937), British long-distance runner, competed in the marathon at the 1912 Summer Olympics
 Flight Lieutenant Edward Pennell DFC (1894–1974), British WWI flying ace and local politician
 Joan Kiddell-Monroe (1908–1972), British author and illustrator of children's books
 Pat Fletcher (1916–1985) golfer, born in Clacton-on-Sea and emigrated to Canada
 Jennifer Worth RN RM (1935–2011) a British nurse and musician
 Mike Everitt (born 1941), English former footballer and manager, over 300 pro games
 Graham Hurley (born 1946), English crime fiction writer
Paul Barber (born 1951), British actor, best known for playing Denzil Tulser in Only Fools and Horses
 Steve Foley an English former professional footballer, made 283 appearances for Colchester United
 Stephen D. Nash (born 1954), English wildlife artist who primarily specialises in primates
 Steve Wright (born 1959), English former professional footballer in over 300 games
 Sade (Helen Folasade Adu, CBE, born 1959), singer, songwriter, model and actress, from the age of 11, lived in Holland-on-Sea, a suburb of Clacton
 Barry Lamb (born 1963), experimental musician, composer
 Beth Goddard (born 1969), British actress
 Paul Banks (born 1978), lead singer of rock band Interpol
 Ian Westlake (born 1983), English footballer, over 300 league and cup games
 Tom Eastman (born 1991), English professional footballer, nearly 400 games for Colchester

Cultural references
On the Easter weekend of 1964, rival youth gangs of Mods and Rockers descended upon Clacton-on-Sea. They created mild havoc by fighting with each other.

The music video for "Always on My Mind" by the Pet Shop Boys was filmed in Clacton, which was also the setting for their film It Couldn't Happen Here. Parts of the 2019 film Yesterday (working title All You Need Is Love) were also filmed in Clacton.

Gallery

See also
 Clactonian Man

Notes

References
 
 The Clacton Spear. The Natural History Museum. (2012). Retrieved 2012-02-16.

External links

 Tendring District Council

 
Towns in Essex
Seaside resorts in Essex
Populated coastal places in Essex
Aviation accidents and incidents locations in England
Beaches of Essex
Tendring